The Spectrum Youth and Family Services has been offering shelter and support services to at-risk and homeless youth since 1970. The organization is located in Burlington, Vermont, and serves youth ages 14–21.

History
In 1970 the Burlington Ecumenical Action Ministry founded SHAC, which stood for Shelter Action and later became known as Spectrum Youth and Family Services. Present-day Senator Patrick Leahy, then the Chittenden County State's Attorney (local prosecutor), was one of Spectrum’s early board members.

Programs
Of primary importance is the Spectrum One Stop (SOS). It is located in downtown Burlington and houses all of Spectrum's services are under one roof. SOS is open seven days a week. Staff provides eligible clients with the  basic needs of food, clothing, and shelter.

Other services include employment and job-skills training, education, life-skills training, mental health and substance abuse counseling, mentoring, violence intervention programs, juvenile justice, and street outreach.

The organization's residential programs provide homeless and at-risk youth with emergency shelter and transitional living arrangements. There are a total of 28 beds in three shelters for homeless youths. A fourth site doubles as an emergency shelter but is designed as a drop-in center which offers youth ages 14–21 services, including education, employment, substance abuse and mental health counseling. In terms of basic needs, the drop-in center serves as a safe place for young people to eat a meal, use the telephone, do laundry, get clothing, or take a shower. In 2009, Spectrum served 3,000 youths.

Awards
In 2009, the National Network for Youth named the group "Agency of the Year". And in 2010, Spectrum's Counseling Program was awarded an Innovation Award in Substance Abuse Services (iAward) sponsored by the State Associations of Addiction Services (SAAS) and NIATx. Spectrum was chosen for this national award for its rapid referral and assessment program, which reduces wait times for outpatient services, such as treatment for drug and alcohol abuse.

References 

Organizations based in Burlington, Vermont
1970 establishments in Vermont
Mental health organizations in Vermont
Addiction organizations in the United States
Organizations established in 1970